Isabelle Carbonell is a Belgian-Uruguayan-American award-winning experimental documentary filmmaker, and an assistant film professor at the American University of Paris. She holds a PhD in film 

from the University of California, Santa Cruz. Her research and practice lie at the intersection of expanded documentary, environmental justice, and the Anthropocene, while striving to develop new visual and sonic approaches and methods to rethink documentary filmmaking and create a "multispecies cinema". Imbued in all her work is the connection between the slow violence of environmental disaster, climate change, bodies of water, more-than-humans, and the future. ​​Carbonell's award-winning films and installation works have been presented in museums, film festivals, and art galleries internationally.

Academic publications 
Some of Carbonell's work comprise the following academic publications:

Interactive Multispecies Documentary Methods (2022)
Multispecies Cinema in Wretched Waters: The Slow Violence of the Rio Doce Disaster (2021)
Polyps are a Pluriverse in the Feral Atlas (2020)
A Story on Story: Camel Racing, Robot Jockeys, and Documentary Filmmaking (2020) 
Coming to Our Senses beyond the Talking-Head: the Panesthetic Documentary Interview (2018)
The Ethics of Big Data in Big Agriculture (2016)
Golden Snail Opera: the More-Than-Human-Performance of Friendly Farming on Taiwan's Lanyang Plain (2016)

Education 
Carbonell holds a PhD in film from the University of California, Santa Cruz. She also received her B.A. in Residential College Social Science and in Environmental Science from the University of Michigan, Ann Arbor, MI and completed her M.A. in Film and Digital Media at the University of California, Santa Cruz.

Awards and nominations 

 Princess Grace Award | Graduate Film Scholarship 2019
 Mellon Dissertation grant Beyond the End of the World 2019-2020
Best Digital Media Award from Fingerlakes Environmental Film Festival 2019 for The River Runs Red
Best Ethnographic Interactive Award from the American Anthropological Association 2018 for The River Runs Red
 Honorable Mention for Cultural Horizons Prize 2017 for Golden Snail Opera 
 Berkeley Law Human Rights Fellowship Grant 2017 for The River Runs Red
 Georgetown University Environmental Initiative Grant 2017 for The River Runs Red
 Jessica Roy Award 2016 for The River Runs Red
 Best Director Award at IdyllWild Film Festival 2015 for Trashborn
 Best Editing Award at the BAWIFV Film Festival 2013 for Baffle Their Minds With Bullsh*t
 World Health Organization in Kampala, Uganda. Honorable mention Vietnam and Public Health 2008
 James H. Robertson Award for Photography and Studio Arts, Residential College University of Michigan 2007

Film Festivals

Filmography

Installations

References

External links
 Official Website of Isabelle Carbonell

American documentary filmmakers
Living people
University of Michigan alumni
People from Washington, D.C.
Year of birth missing (living people)
Place of birth missing (living people)
Documentary photographers